Resorts of the Canadian Rockies Inc. (RCR) is the largest private ski resort owner/operator in Canada, owning six ski resorts across Canada.


Current properties
The company owns Nakiska in Alberta as well as Fernie Alpine Resort, Kimberley Alpine Resort and Kicking Horse Mountain Resort in British Columbia. Resorts outside the Canadian Rockies are Mont-Sainte-Anne and Stoneham Mountain Resort in Quebec.

RCR also owns and manages a number of hotels, backcountry lodges and golf courses, including Trickle Creek Golf Resort and Trickle Creek Lodge in Kimberley, Wintergreen Golf and Country Club in Bragg Creek, and The Slope Side (formerly Wolf's Den) and Lizard Creek Lodges in Fernie.

History 
RCR was previously owned by Charlie Locke before he saw some financial trouble, and after a period in bankruptcy protection, was bailed out by Alberta billionaire N. Murray Edwards in 2001.

RCR previously operated Fortress Mountain Resort, Lake Louise Mountain Resort, Wintergreen Ski Area and West Louise Lodge.  

On December 29, 2011, RCR purchased Kicking Horse Mountain Resort from original developer Ballast Nedam.

References

External links
Resorts of the Canadian Rockies - Official website

Hotel and leisure companies of Canada
Companies based in Calgary